Pterostichus is a very large genus of ground beetles with a Holarctic distribution in the subfamily Harpalinae. It has over 1,200 species. The beetles are predatory, but sometimes feed on strawberries. They can be found under rocks and prefer slightly moist, sandy soil although preferences differ between species.

Species 
These species and subgenera are included in the genus Pterostichus.

Subgenus Abea Morita, 1992
 Pterostichus yamauchii Morita, 1992
Subgenus Adelopterus Reitter, 1886
 Pterostichus ambiguus (Fairmaire, 1858)
Subgenus Adelosia Stephens, 1835
 Pterostichus macer (Marsham, 1802)
Subgenus Agastillus Reitter, 1892
 Pterostichus capitatus (Chaudoir, 1850)
 Pterostichus cratocephalus (Tschitscherine, 1897)
 Pterostichus cucujinus Reitter, 1892
 Pterostichus eriwanicus (Tschitscherine, 1897)
Subgenus Anilloferonia Van Dyke, 1926
 Pterostichus diana LaBonte, 2013
 Pterostichus malkini (Hatch, 1953)
 Pterostichus testaceus (Van Dyke, 1926)
Subgenus Anomostichus Sciaky, 1995
 Pterostichus anomostriatus Sciaky, 1995
Subgenus Aphaonus Reitter, 1887
 Pterostichus arcanoides (Lorenz, 1998)
 Pterostichus compressus (Rost, 1892)
 Pterostichus cylindriformis (Reitter, 1887)
 Pterostichus koenigianus (Tschitscherine, 1891)
 Pterostichus mariamae Zamotajlov; Solodovnikov & Fominykh, 2015
 Pterostichus miroshnikovi (Zamotajlov, 1991)
 Pterostichus neilgaimani Chaladze & Kalatozishvili, 2017
 Pterostichus pseudopercus (Reitter, 1889)
 Pterostichus starckianus (Reitter, 1887)
 Pterostichus svetlanae Zamotajlov; Solodovnikov & Fominykh, 2015
 Pterostichus trubilini Zamotajlov, 1997
Subgenus Argutor Dejean, 1821
 Pterostichus aanistschenkoi O. & E.Berlov, 1999
 Pterostichus akozyrevi O. & E.Berlov, 1999
 Pterostichus bhadravati Jedlicka, 1965
 Pterostichus chameleon (Motschulsky, 1866)
 Pterostichus commutabilis (Motschulsky, 1866)
 Pterostichus cryobioides (Chaudoir, 1868)
 Pterostichus cursor (Dejean, 1828)
 Pterostichus dulcis (Bates, 1883)
 Pterostichus kerzhneri Lafer, 1983
 Pterostichus leonisi Apfelbeck, 1904
 Pterostichus praetermissus (Chaudoir, 1868)
 Pterostichus sulcitarsis A.Morawitz, 1862
 Pterostichus vernalis (Panzer, 1796)
Subgenus Asioplatysma Kryzhanovskij, 1968
 Pterostichus capito (Tschitscherine, 1900)
 Pterostichus darvazicus Kryzhanovskij, 1968
 Pterostichus karateghinicus Mikhailov, 1972
 Pterostichus klapperichi Jedlicka, 1956
 Pterostichus medvedevi Kryzhanovskij & Mikhailov, 1972
 Pterostichus mujahedeeni Savich, 1999
 Pterostichus rufopiceus Heyden, 1890
 Pterostichus talibani Savich, 1999
Subgenus Badistrinus Motschulsky, 1866
 Pterostichus arrowi Jedlicka, 1936
 Pterostichus arrowianus Jedlicka, 1938
 Pterostichus bandotaro Tanaka, 1958
 Pterostichus doris Jedlicka, 1962
 Pterostichus haptoderoides Tschitscherine, 1889
 Pterostichus kajimurai Habu & Tanaka, 1957
 Pterostichus laticollis (Motschulsky, 1844)
 Pterostichus procephalus Bates, 1873
Subgenus Bothriopterus Chaudoir, 1835
 Pterostichus ademidovae O.Berlov, 1996
 Pterostichus adstrictus Eschscholtz, 1823
 Pterostichus aeneocupreus (Fairmaire, 1887)
 Pterostichus bhunetansis Davies, 2004
 Pterostichus commixtiformis Roubal, 1920
 Pterostichus ferghanicus Kabak, 2001
 Pterostichus lustrans LeConte, 1851
 Pterostichus mariae (Lutshnik, 1921)
 Pterostichus mutus (Say, 1823)
 Pterostichus oblongopunctatus (Fabricius, 1787)
 Pterostichus oregonus LeConte, 1861
 Pterostichus pensylvanicus LeConte, 1873
 Pterostichus quadrifoveolatus Letzner, 1852
 Pterostichus subovatus (Motschulsky, 1861)
 Pterostichus trinarius (Casey, 1918)
 Pterostichus tropicalis (Bates, 1882)
 Pterostichus zyzzovi O. & E.Berlov, 1996
Subgenus Calopterus Chaudoir, 1838
 Pterostichus pilosus (Host, 1790)
 Pterostichus selmanni (Duftschmid, 1812)
Subgenus Carllindrothius Habu, 1984
 Pterostichus colonus (Bates, 1883)
Subgenus Cheporus Latreille, 1829
 Pterostichus burmeisteri Heer, 1837
 Pterostichus dissimilis (A. & G.B.Villa, 1833)
 Pterostichus muehlfeldii (Duftschmid, 1812)
 Pterostichus transversalis (Duftschmid, 1812)
Subgenus Chinapterus O.Berlov, 1998
 Pterostichus lianhuaensis Dorjerem; Shi & Liang, 2020
 Pterostichus liupanensis Dorjerem; Shi & Liang, 2020
 Pterostichus przewalskyi Tschitscherine, 1888
 Pterostichus singularis Tschitscherine, 1889
Subgenus Circinatus Sciaky, 1996
 Pterostichus adelphus Shi & Liang, 2015
 Pterostichus agilis Allegro & Sciaky, 2010
 Pterostichus ailaoicus Shi & Liang, 2015
 Pterostichus baenningeri Jedlicka, 1931
 Pterostichus batxatensis Fedorenko, 2019
 Pterostichus beneshi Sciaky, 1996
 Pterostichus bullatus Allegro & Sciaky, 2010
 Pterostichus camelus Shi & Liang, 2015
 Pterostichus caobang Fedorenko, 2019
 Pterostichus cavazzutianus Shi & Liang, 2015
 Pterostichus dentifer Allegro & Sciaky, 2010
 Pterostichus dimorphus Shi & Liang, 2015
 Pterostichus expolitus Fedorenko, 2019
 Pterostichus hoanglien Fedorenko, 2019
 Pterostichus laocaiensis Fedorenko, 2019
 Pterostichus liciniformis Csiki, 1930
 Pterostichus maitreya Shi & Liang, 2015
 Pterostichus miao Shi & Liang, 2015
 Pterostichus phangxipang Fedorenko, 2019
 Pterostichus phiaoc Fedorenko, 2019
 Pterostichus pohnerti Jedlicka, 1934
 Pterostichus subtilissimus Sciaky, 1996
 Pterostichus tumulus Shi & Liang, 2015
 Pterostichus wangjiani Shi & Liang, 2015
 Pterostichus xilingensis Allegro & Sciaky, 2010
 Pterostichus yan Shi & Liang, 2015
 Pterostichus yuxiaodongi Shi & Liang, 2015
 Pterostichus zhygealu Shi & Liang, 2015
 Pterostichus zoiai Sciaky, 1996
Subgenus Cophosus Dejean, 1821
 Pterostichus cylindricus (Herbst, 1784)
Subgenus Cryobius Chaudoir, 1838
 Pterostichus abaxoides (Dejean, 1828)
 Pterostichus acrogonus (Chaudoir, 1843)
 Pterostichus akkusianus Kirschenhofer, 1981
 Pterostichus altaiensis (Poppius, 1906)
 Pterostichus amaroides (Dejean, 1828)
 Pterostichus amblypterus (Chaudoir, 1868)
 Pterostichus amoenus (Dejean, 1828)
 Pterostichus amurensis (Poppius, 1906)
 Pterostichus anatolicus Jedlicka, 1963
 Pterostichus apenninus (Dejean, 1831)
 Pterostichus aralarensis (Mateu, 1945)
 Pterostichus archangaicus Shilenkov, 2000
 Pterostichus arcticola (Chaudoir, 1868)
 Pterostichus argutoriformis (Poppius, 1906)
 Pterostichus auriga Ball, 1962
 Pterostichus bargusinicus Shilenkov, 2000
 Pterostichus barlensis Straneo, 1935
 Pterostichus barryorum Ball, 1962
 Pterostichus biocryus Ball, 1962
 Pterostichus blandulus L.Miller, 1859
 Pterostichus blumenthali Heinz, 1965
 Pterostichus brevicornis (Kirby, 1837)
 Pterostichus breviusculus (R.F.Sahlberg, 1844)
 Pterostichus bryanti (Van Dyke, 1951)
 Pterostichus bryantoides Ball, 1962
 Pterostichus burjaticus (Poppius, 1906)
 Pterostichus cacumensis Ball, 1966
 Pterostichus cantabricus (L.Schaufuss, 1862)
 Pterostichus caribou Ball, 1962
 Pterostichus carradei (Gautier des Cottes, 1866)
 Pterostichus champenoisi (Croissandeau, 1893)
 Pterostichus chipewyan Ball, 1962
 Pterostichus colasi (Jeannel, 1937)
 Pterostichus convexus (Gebler, 1847)
 Pterostichus coreicus Jedlicka, 1962
 Pterostichus davshensis Shilenkov, 2000
 Pterostichus dubiosus (Tschitscherine, 1894)
 Pterostichus ehlersi (Heyden, 1881)
 Pterostichus empetricola (Dejean, 1828)
 Pterostichus espanoli (J. & E.Vives, 1977)
 Pterostichus euxinus Straneo, 1935
 Pterostichus exceptus (J.Sahlberg, 1885)
 Pterostichus firmus (Lutshnik, 1933)
 Pterostichus fulvescens (Motschulsky, 1844)
 Pterostichus gerstlensis Ball, 1962
 Pterostichus glacialis (Brisout de Barneville, 1863)
 Pterostichus glukhomanka Sundukov, 2013
 Pterostichus haftorni Lindroth, 1969
 Pterostichus herzi (Poppius, 1906)
 Pterostichus homalonotus (Tschitscherine, 1894)
 Pterostichus horvatovichi Kirschenhofer, 1991
 Pterostichus hudsonicus LeConte, 1863
 Pterostichus infimus (Chaudoir, 1868)
 Pterostichus inopinatus (Lutshnik, 1933)
 Pterostichus iripennis (Chaudoir, 1868)
 Pterostichus ishiharai Ishida & Shibata, 1961
 Pterostichus jacobsoni (Poppius, 1906)
 Pterostichus jaechi Kirschenhofer, 1997
 Pterostichus josephi Csiki, 1930
 Pterostichus kadjaranze (Jedlicka, 1947)
 Pterostichus kaninensis (Poppius, 1906)
 Pterostichus kavanaughi Shilenkov, 2000
 Pterostichus kaynashensis Schweiger, 1967
 Pterostichus kolymensis Erjiomin, 1998
 Pterostichus korgei Jedlicka, 1964
 Pterostichus kotzebuei Ball, 1962
 Pterostichus kultianus Jedlicka, 1946
 Pterostichus kuraicus Shilenkov, 2000
 Pterostichus kurosai Tanaka, 1958
 Pterostichus kurosawai Tanaka, 1958
 Pterostichus lamuticus (Poppius, 1906)
 Pterostichus latiusculus (Chaudoir, 1868)
 Pterostichus longipes (Poppius, 1906)
 Pterostichus lucidus (Motschulsky, 1844)
 Pterostichus macedonicus Apfelbeck, 1918
 Pterostichus macrothorax (Poppius, 1906)
 Pterostichus maeklini (Poppius, 1906)
 Pterostichus mandibularoides Ball, 1966
 Pterostichus marani Jedlicka, 1967
 Pterostichus middendorffi (J.Sahlberg, 1875)
 Pterostichus negligens (Sturm, 1824)
 Pterostichus nemoralis (Graells, 1851)
 Pterostichus nigripalpis (Poppius, 1906)
 Pterostichus nivalis (R.F.Sahlberg, 1844)
 Pterostichus nordqvisti (J.Sahlberg, 1885)
 Pterostichus oblongiusculus (Motschulsky, 1850)
 Pterostichus ochoticus (R.F.Sahlberg, 1844)
 Pterostichus palekhai E. & O.Berlov, 1996
 Pterostichus parasimilis Ball, 1962
 Pterostichus parviceps (Poppius, 1906)
 Pterostichus pinguedineus (Eschscholtz, 1823)
 Pterostichus pithyusicus (Lutshnik, 1933)
 Pterostichus planus (J.Sahlberg, 1885)
 Pterostichus poppiusianus (Jakobson, 1907)
 Pterostichus procerulus (Heyden, 1880)
 Pterostichus properans (Chaudoir, 1868)
 Pterostichus pseudostuxbergi (Poppius, 1906)
 Pterostichus pumilio (Dejean, 1828)
 Pterostichus punctiger (J.Sahlberg, 1880)
 Pterostichus pusillus (Dejean, 1828)
 Pterostichus quadraticollis (Chaudoir, 1846)
 Pterostichus riparius (Dejean, 1828)
 Pterostichus rodiovoni Shilenkov, 2000
 Pterostichus rufonitens (Fairmaire, 1866)
 Pterostichus safonovae Budarin, 1995
 Pterostichus sahlbergi (Tschitscherine, 1894)
 Pterostichus scitus (Mäklin, 1878)
 Pterostichus shilenkovi Erjiomin & Kabak, 1991
 Pterostichus similis Mannerheim, 1852
 Pterostichus sojot Shilenkov, 2000
 Pterostichus soperi Ball, 1966
 Pterostichus splendidus Park, 2013
 Pterostichus spornyi Sundukov, 2013
 Pterostichus stantonensis Ball, 1966
 Pterostichus subgibbus (Motschulsky, 1860)
 Pterostichus subiasi (Ortuño & Zaballos, 1992)
 Pterostichus subsinuatus (Dejean, 1828)
 Pterostichus surgens LeConte, 1878
 Pterostichus tareumiut Ball, 1962
 Pterostichus taskylensis Shilenkov, 2000
 Pterostichus tatricus Kult, 1947
 Pterostichus theeli (Mäklin, 1878)
 Pterostichus tichomirovi Erjiomin, 1990
 Pterostichus tiliaceoradix Ball, 1962
 Pterostichus tokmakovae Sundukov, 2013
 Pterostichus tunkinensis Shilenkov, 2000
 Pterostichus udokanensis Shilenkov, 2000
 Pterostichus ulubeyensis Kirschenhofer, 1981
 Pterostichus unctulatus (Duftschmid, 1812)
 Pterostichus ventricosus (Eschscholtz, 1823)
 Pterostichus woodi Ball & Currie, 1997
Subgenus Cylindrocharis Casey, 1918
 Pterostichus acutipes Barr, 1971
 Pterostichus hypogeus Barr, 1971
 Pterostichus rostratus (Newman, 1838)
Subgenus Eosteropus Tschitscherine, 1902
 Pterostichus abensis Morita, 2010
 Pterostichus abudarini O. & E.Berlov, 1997
 Pterostichus aenescens (Chaudoir, 1850)
 Pterostichus aereipennis (Solsky, 1872)
 Pterostichus aethiops (Panzer, 1796)
 Pterostichus ainus Plutenko, 2005
 Pterostichus alacer A.Morawitz, 1862
 Pterostichus bituberculatus (Tschitscherine, 1899)
 Pterostichus circulosus Lindroth, 1966
 Pterostichus coruscus (Tschitscherine, 1895)
 Pterostichus creper (Tschitscherine, 1902)
 Pterostichus discrepans A.Morawitz, 1862
 Pterostichus dudkoi Sundukov, 2013
 Pterostichus faldermanni Schatzmayr, 1929
 Pterostichus funakoshii Morita, 2007
 Pterostichus hidanus Morita, 2010
 Pterostichus hiramatsui Morita, 2010
 Pterostichus hirasawai Morita, 2010
 Pterostichus imurai Morita, 2007
 Pterostichus japonicus (Motschulsky, 1861)
 Pterostichus karasawai Tanaka, 1958
 Pterostichus kimioi Morita, 2011
 Pterostichus makolskii G.Müller, 1933
 Pterostichus mandzhuricus (Lutshnik, 1916)
 Pterostichus mannerheimii (Dejean, 1831)
 Pterostichus matsunagai Morita, 2011
 Pterostichus maurusiacus (Mannerheim, 1825)
 Pterostichus mizunoyai Morita, 2007
 Pterostichus moestus (Say, 1823)
 Pterostichus nasuensis Morita, 2007
 Pterostichus noburai Morita, 2008
 Pterostichus ohkawai Morita, 2010
 Pterostichus orientalis (Motschulsky, 1844)
 Pterostichus rengensis Morita, 2010
 Pterostichus rufitarsis (Dejean, 1828)
 Pterostichus sakuraii Morita, 2008
 Pterostichus shimizui Morita, 2010
 Pterostichus sudai Morita, 1991
 Pterostichus superciliosus (Say, 1823)
 Pterostichus tenuimarginatus (Chaudoir, 1868)
 Pterostichus tokui Morita, 2007
 Pterostichus tuberculiger (Tschitscherine, 1897)
 Pterostichus virescens (Gebler, 1833)
 Pterostichus yoshizawai Morita, 2010
Subgenus Ethira Andrewes, 1936
 Pterostichus cometes (Andrewes, 1936)
 Pterostichus depilatus (Bates, 1889)
 Pterostichus heinzianus Sciaky, 1996
 Pterostichus multiseta (Straneo, 1984)
 Pterostichus piliferus (Bates, 1878)
 Pterostichus pseudopilifer (Straneo, 1957)
 Pterostichus rugiceps (Straneo, 1984)
 Pterostichus seticeps (Straneo, 1984)
 Pterostichus sharanus (Straneo, 1984)
 Pterostichus variseta (Straneo, 1984)
 Pterostichus viridellus Straneo, 1984
Subgenus Falsargutor Kryzhanovskij, 1983
 Pterostichus kataevi Kryzhanovskij, 1989
 Pterostichus ponticus Kirschenhofer, 1987
 Pterostichus pseudopedius Reitter, 1887
Subgenus Feronidius Jeannel, 1942
 Pterostichus brevipennis (Chevrolat, 1840)
 Pterostichus fornicatus (Kolenati, 1845)
 Pterostichus hungaricus (Dejean, 1828)
 Pterostichus incommodus Schaum, 1858
 Pterostichus melas (Creutzer, 1799)
Subgenus Feronina Casey, 1918
 Pterostichus barri Bousquet, 2006
 Pterostichus palmi Schaeffer, 1910
Subgenus Fukienostichus Lafer, 1983
 Pterostichus shaovuensis Jedlicka, 1956
Subgenus Gastrosticta Casey, 1918
 Pterostichus enodis Bousquet, 1992
 Pterostichus mutoides Bousquet, 1992
 Pterostichus obesulus LeConte, 1873
 Pterostichus ophryoderus (Chaudoir, 1878)
 Pterostichus punctiventris (Chaudoir, 1878)
 Pterostichus putus Casey, 1913
 Pterostichus sayanus Csiki, 1930
 Pterostichus subacutus (Casey, 1918)
 Pterostichus tumescens LeConte, 1863
 Pterostichus ventralis (Say, 1823)
Subgenus Georgeballius Habu, 1984
 Pterostichus hoplites (Bates, 1883)
Subgenus Gutta Wrase & J.Schmidt, 2006
 Pterostichus adulterinus Wrase & J.Schmidt, 2006
 Pterostichus gaoligongensis Wrase & J.Schmidt, 2006
 Pterostichus kongshuhensis B.Gueorguiev, 2015
 Pterostichus phungaraziensis Wrase & J.Schmidt, 2006
Subgenus Haplomaseus Reitter, 1896
 Pterostichus abagonensis Reitter, 1896
 Pterostichus andreae (Tschitscherine, 1897)
 Pterostichus arator (Faldermann, 1836)
 Pterostichus armenus (Faldermann, 1836)
 Pterostichus astutus (Tschitscherine, 1903)
 Pterostichus balikliensis Hovorka & Skoupy, 2007
 Pterostichus caucasicola (Tschitscherine, 1893)
 Pterostichus caucasicus (Ménétriés, 1832)
 Pterostichus chasautianus Vysoky, 1984
 Pterostichus chydaeus (Tschitscherine, 1897)
 Pterostichus consanguineus (Chaudoir, 1878)
 Pterostichus cristicaudis Kurnakov, 1962
 Pterostichus denticaudis Kurnakov, 1962
 Pterostichus giresuni Jedlicka, 1965
 Pterostichus goriensis (Tschitscherine, 1897)
 Pterostichus heinzi Jedlicka, 1965
 Pterostichus ikizderensis Hovorka & Skoupy, 2007
 Pterostichus jugicola (Lutshnik, 1916)
 Pterostichus krulikovskyi (Lutshnik, 1933)
 Pterostichus meskheticus Belousov, 1991
 Pterostichus novotnyorum Vysoky, 1981
 Pterostichus olegi Belousov, 1991
 Pterostichus phaeus (Lutshnik, 1922)
 Pterostichus porcellus Kurnakov, 1962
 Pterostichus pseudoastutus Hovorka & Skoupy, 2007
 Pterostichus rousi Kirschenhofer, 1982
 Pterostichus skoupyi Hovorka & Skoupy, 2007
 Pterostichus staveni Hovorka & Skoupy, 2007
 Pterostichus tamsii (Dejean, 1831)
 Pterostichus tanjae Hovorka & Skoupy, 2007
 Pterostichus woronowi (Lutshnik, 1916)
Subgenus Haptotapinus Reitter, 1886
 Pterostichus aksekianus (Straneo, 1988)
 Pterostichus besucheti (Straneo, 1988)
 Pterostichus bythiniensis (Maran, 1944)
 Pterostichus crassiusculus (Chaudoir, 1868)
 Pterostichus dipojranus (Straneo, 1988)
 Pterostichus matchai (Jedlicka, 1930)
 Pterostichus oblongoparallelus Maran, 1932
 Pterostichus odontocnemis G.Müller, 1931
 Pterostichus orduensis (Straneo, 1988)
 Pterostichus pavani (Straneo, 1988)
 Pterostichus reissi G.Müller, 1931
 Pterostichus vseteckai (Maran, 1944)
Subgenus Huaius Tian; Huang; Chen & Ding, 2019
 Pterostichus caoi Tian; Huang; Chen & Ding, 2019
 Pterostichus hanwang Tian & He, 2020
 Pterostichus tiankeng Tian; Huang; Chen & Ding, 2019
 Pterostichus yuae Tian; Huang; Chen & Ding, 2019
Subgenus Hypherpes Chaudoir, 1838
 Pterostichus adoxus (Say, 1823)
 Pterostichus algidus LeConte, 1853
 Pterostichus amethystinus Mannerheim, 1843
 Pterostichus annosus Casey, 1913
 Pterostichus arcanus Casey, 1913
 Pterostichus baldwini (Casey, 1924)
 Pterostichus barbarinus Casey, 1913
 Pterostichus brachylobus Kavanaugh & LaBonte, 2006
 Pterostichus californicus (Dejean, 1828)
 Pterostichus canallatus Casey, 1913
 Pterostichus castaneus (Dejean, 1828)
 Pterostichus castanipes (Ménétriés, 1843)
 Pterostichus congestus (Ménétriés, 1843)
 Pterostichus craterensis (Hatch, 1949)
 Pterostichus crenicollis LeConte, 1873
 Pterostichus ecarinatus Hatch, 1936
 Pterostichus esuriens Casey, 1913
 Pterostichus gliscans Casey, 1913
 Pterostichus gracilior LeConte, 1873
 Pterostichus herculaneus Mannerheim, 1843
 Pterostichus hornii LeConte, 1873
 Pterostichus illustris LeConte, 1851
 Pterostichus inermis Fall, 1901
 Pterostichus isabellae LeConte, 1851
 Pterostichus jacobinus Casey, 1913
 Pterostichus laborans Casey, 1913
 Pterostichus lacertus Casey, 1913
 Pterostichus lama (Ménétriés, 1843)
 Pterostichus lassulus (Casey, 1920)
 Pterostichus lattini LaBonte, 2006
 Pterostichus luscus (Casey, 1918)
 Pterostichus menetriesii LeConte, 1873
 Pterostichus mercedianus (Casey, 1918)
 Pterostichus miscellus Casey, 1913
 Pterostichus morionides (Chaudoir, 1868)
 Pterostichus neobrunneus Lindroth, 1966
 Pterostichus nigrocaeruleus Van Dyke, 1926
 Pterostichus obsidianus Casey, 1913
 Pterostichus occultus Casey, 1913
 Pterostichus ordinarius Casey, 1913
 Pterostichus ovalipennis Casey, 1913
 Pterostichus panticulatus Casey, 1913
 Pterostichus pergracilis (Casey, 1920)
 Pterostichus planctus LeConte, 1853
 Pterostichus protensiformis (Casey, 1924)
 Pterostichus protractus LeConte, 1860
 Pterostichus restrictus (Casey, 1918)
 Pterostichus scutellaris LeConte, 1873
 Pterostichus sejungendus (Chaudoir, 1868)
 Pterostichus serripes (LeConte, 1875)
 Pterostichus setosus Hatch, 1951
 Pterostichus sierranus Casey, 1913
 Pterostichus sponsor Casey, 1913
 Pterostichus spraguei LeConte, 1873
 Pterostichus suffusus Casey, 1913
 Pterostichus tarsalis LeConte, 1873
 Pterostichus tristis (Dejean, 1828)
 Pterostichus tuberculofemoratus Hatch, 1936
 Pterostichus vandykei Schaeffer, 1910
 Pterostichus vicinus Mannerheim, 1843
 Pterostichus ybousqueti O.Berlov, 1999
Subgenus Jedlickaia Sciaky, 1997
 Pterostichus sterbai Jedlicka, 1934
Subgenus Koreonialoe Park & Kwon, 1996
 Pterostichus adatarasanus Sasakawa, 2005
 Pterostichus akitai Morita, 2004
 Pterostichus apiculatiphallus Nemoto, 1988
 Pterostichus asahinus Habu & Baba, 1960
 Pterostichus bellatrix (Tschitscherine, 1895)
 Pterostichus bifidiphallus Nemoto, 1988
 Pterostichus chokaisanus Sasakawa, 2009
 Pterostichus eboshiyamanus Sasakawa, 2009
 Pterostichus falcispinus Sasakawa, 2005
 Pterostichus fukube Sugimura, 2005
 Pterostichus gassanus Sasakawa, 2009
 Pterostichus gujoensis Toda, 2012
 Pterostichus ishikawai Nemoto, 1988
 Pterostichus ishikawaioides Sasakawa; J.L.Kim; J.K.Kim & Kubota, 2008
 Pterostichus isolatus Sasakawa; Kim & Kubota, 2005
 Pterostichus iwakiensis Sasakawa, 2009
 Pterostichus iwasakii Kasahara, 1990
 Pterostichus ixion (Tschitscherine, 1902)
 Pterostichus jiricola Sasakawa; J.L.Kim; J.K.Kim & Kubota, 2008
 Pterostichus kitakamisanus Sasakawa, 2005
 Pterostichus koheii Nakane, 1963
 Pterostichus kuraiyamanus Morita & Ohkawa, 2010
 Pterostichus kurikomasanus Sasakawa, 2005
 Pterostichus kuwolsanensis Li & Zhang, 2014
 Pterostichus macrogenys Bates, 1883
 Pterostichus microps Heyden, 1887
 Pterostichus miyazawai Morita & Ohkawa, 2009
 Pterostichus momuranus Morita; Ohkawa & Kurihara, 2013
 Pterostichus monolineatus Sasakawa; Mitsuduka & H.Ito, 2020
 Pterostichus nagasawai N.Ito & Ogai, 2015
 Pterostichus ohsawacavus Sasakawa, 2005
 Pterostichus opacipennis Jedlicka, 1934
 Pterostichus palgongsanus Nemoto, 1988
 Pterostichus shikatai Toda, 2012
 Pterostichus shinbodakensis Sasakawa & H.Ito, 2017
 Pterostichus shirakamisan Sasakawa, 2009
 Pterostichus shirakamisanus Sasakawa, 2005
 Pterostichus shojii Sugimura, 2006
 Pterostichus sumondakensis Sasakawa, 2005
 Pterostichus syleus Kirschenhofer, 1997
 Pterostichus taebaegsanus Nemoto, 1988
 Pterostichus takadateyamanus Sasakawa, 2009
 Pterostichus tanakai Ishida, 1964
 Pterostichus tateishiyamanus Sasakawa & H.Ito, 2017
 Pterostichus teretis Park & Kwon, 1996
 Pterostichus todai Morita & Kanie, 1997
 Pterostichus togyusanus Park & Kwon, 1996
 Pterostichus toyodai Morita & Kurosa, 1998
 Pterostichus uedaorum Morita & Hirasawa, 1996
 Pterostichus vicinus Park & Kwon, 1996
 Pterostichus woongbii Park & Kwon, 1996
 Pterostichus yahikosanus Sasakawa, 2009
 Pterostichus yamizosanus Sasakawa, 2005
 Pterostichus yorikoae Sugimura, 2007
Subgenus Kozyrevius O.Berlov, 1998
 Pterostichus militaris (Tschitscherine, 1893)
Subgenus Lamenius Bousquet, 1999
 Pterostichus caudicalis (Say, 1823)
Subgenus Lenapterus O.Berlov, 1996
 Pterostichus agonus G.Horn, 1880
 Pterostichus cancellatus (Motschulsky, 1860)
 Pterostichus costatus (Ménétriés, 1851)
 Pterostichus galae Farkac & Plutenko, 1996
 Pterostichus gromykoi Sundukov, 2005
 Pterostichus marginatus Matsumura, 1911
 Pterostichus punctatissimus (Randall, 1838)
 Pterostichus rugosipennis Jedlicka, 1932
 Pterostichus saxicola (Tschitscherine, 1899)
 Pterostichus vermiculosus (Ménétriés, 1851)
Subgenus Leptoferonia Casey, 1918
 Pterostichus angustus (Dejean, 1828)
 Pterostichus beyeri Van Dyke, 1926
 Pterostichus blodgettensis Will, 2007
 Pterostichus caligans G.Horn, 1891
 Pterostichus cochlearis Hacker, 1968
 Pterostichus deino Will, 2007
 Pterostichus enyo Will, 2007
 Pterostichus falli Van Dyke, 1926
 Pterostichus fenyesi Csiki, 1930
 Pterostichus fuchsi Schaeffer, 1910
 Pterostichus hackerae Will, 2016
 Pterostichus hatchi Hacker, 1968
 Pterostichus humilis Casey, 1913
 Pterostichus idahoae Csiki, 1930
 Pterostichus inanis G.Horn, 1891
 Pterostichus infernalis Hatch, 1936
 Pterostichus inopinus (Casey, 1918)
 Pterostichus lobatus Hacker, 1968
 Pterostichus marinensis Hacker, 1968
 Pterostichus mattolensis Hacker, 1968
 Pterostichus pemphredo Will, 2007
 Pterostichus pumilus Casey, 1913
 Pterostichus rothi (Hatch, 1951)
 Pterostichus sphodrinus LeConte, 1863
 Pterostichus stapedius Hacker, 1968
 Pterostichus trinitensis Hacker, 1968
 Pterostichus yosemitensis Hacker, 1968
Subgenus Lianoe Gozis, 1882
 Pterostichus amanoi Nakane, 1968
 Pterostichus arribasi Ortuño, 1991
 Pterostichus asturicus (Jeanne, 1966)
 Pterostichus cordatissimus (Straneo, 1937)
 Pterostichus drescoi Nègre, 1957
 Pterostichus dufourii (Dejean, 1828)
 Pterostichus microphthalmus Delarouzée, 1857
 Pterostichus muelleri (Straneo, 1936)
 Pterostichus nadari (Vuillefroy, 1893)
 Pterostichus nakamiyorinus Morita; Ohkawa & Kurihara, 2013
 Pterostichus rousselli Colas, 1963
 Pterostichus sakagamii Morita, 2001
 Pterostichus sudrei Sainte-Claire Deville, 1922
Subgenus Lyrothorax Chaudoir, 1838
 Pterostichus amagisanus Tanaka & Ishida, 1972
 Pterostichus caspius (Ménétriés, 1832)
 Pterostichus eoyoritomus Sasakawa, 2009
 Pterostichus fujitai Tanaka & Ishida, 1972
 Pterostichus yoritomus Bates, 1873
Subgenus Megabea Sciaky, 1997
 Pterostichus tienmushanus Sciaky, 1997
Subgenus Melanius Bonelli, 1810
 Pterostichus aterrimus (Herbst, 1784)
 Pterostichus castor Goulet & Bousquet, 1983
 Pterostichus corvinus (Dejean, 1828)
 Pterostichus ebeninus (Dejean, 1828)
 Pterostichus elongatus (Duftschmid, 1812)
 Pterostichus licenti Jedlicka, 1939
 Pterostichus noguchii Bates, 1873
Subgenus Metallophilus Chaudoir, 1838
 Pterostichus dandongensis Kirschenhofer, 1997
 Pterostichus interruptus (Dejean, 1828)
 Pterostichus kamtschaticus Motschulsky, 1860
 Pterostichus mirus (Tschitscherine, 1894)
 Pterostichus orion (Tschitscherine, 1901)
 Pterostichus pfizenmayeri Poppius, 1906
 Pterostichus rugosus (Gebler, 1823)
 Pterostichus sublaevis (J.Sahlberg, 1880)
Subgenus Micronialoe Park; Kwon & Lafer, 1996
 Pterostichus bifoveolatus Park; Kwon & Lafer, 1996
 Pterostichus chogyesanus Park; Kwon & Lafer, 1996
 Pterostichus kaniei Morita, 2005
Subgenus Monoferonia Casey, 1918
 Pterostichus carolinus Darlington, 1932
 Pterostichus diligendus (Chaudoir, 1868)
 Pterostichus mancus (LeConte, 1853)
 Pterostichus primus Darlington, 1932
Subgenus Morphohaptoderus Tschitscherine, 1898
 Pterostichus bowanus Sciaky, 1997
 Pterostichus cervenkai Sciaky, 1994
 Pterostichus chungkingi Jedlicka, 1932
 Pterostichus confucius Sciaky & Wrase, 1997
 Pterostichus dentellus Facchini & Sciaky, 2003
 Pterostichus dundai Sciaky, 1994
 Pterostichus emei Sciaky, 1994
 Pterostichus expeditus (Tschitscherine, 1898)
 Pterostichus geberti Sciaky & Wrase, 1997
 Pterostichus giacomazzoi Sciaky, 1994
 Pterostichus gongga Sciaky, 1997
 Pterostichus guizhouensis Sciaky, 1997
 Pterostichus huashanus Sciaky, 1994
 Pterostichus hubeicus Facchini & Sciaky, 2003
 Pterostichus irideus Sciaky, 1994
 Pterostichus janatai Sciaky & Wrase, 1997
 Pterostichus kalabi Sciaky, 1994
 Pterostichus kucerai Sciaky, 1997
 Pterostichus lingshanus Sciaky & Wrase, 1997
 Pterostichus maximus Tschitscherine, 1889
 Pterostichus megaloderus Sciaky, 1994
 Pterostichus ming Sciaky & Wrase, 1997
 Pterostichus miroslavi Sciaky & Wrase, 1997
 Pterostichus muellermotzfeldi Wrase & J.Schmidt, 2006
 Pterostichus parvicollis Sciaky & Wrase, 1997
 Pterostichus pseudoplatyderus Sciaky, 1994
 Pterostichus saueri Sciaky, 1994
 Pterostichus schuelkei Sciaky & Wrase, 1997
 Pterostichus shennongjianus Facchini & Sciaky, 2003
 Pterostichus straneellus Jedlicka, 1938
 Pterostichus toledanoi Facchini & Sciaky, 2003
 Pterostichus wenxianensis Allegro & Sciaky, 2010
 Pterostichus yulongshanensis Sciaky, 1997
Subgenus Myosodus Fischer von Waldheim, 1823
 Pterostichus aapsorum Belousov, 1991
 Pterostichus aibgensis Starck, 1890
 Pterostichus avaricus Abdurakhmanov & Kryzhanovskij, 1983
 Pterostichus batesi (Tschitscherine, 1894)
 Pterostichus buglaniensis Kirschenhofer, 1981
 Pterostichus filipjevi (Lutshnik, 1928)
 Pterostichus ingusha (Lutshnik, 1928)
 Pterostichus kiritshenkoi (Lutshnik, 1928)
 Pterostichus lacunosus (Chaudoir, 1844)
 Pterostichus lutshnikianus Bogachev & Kurnakov, 1958
 Pterostichus nivicola (Ménétriés, 1832)
 Pterostichus ordinatus (Fischer von Waldheim, 1823)
 Pterostichus rudestriatus (Reitter, 1883)
 Pterostichus schoenherri Faldermann, 1836
 Pterostichus sodalicius Heyden, 1885
 Pterostichus starcki Heyden, 1885
 Pterostichus stoeckleini (Straneo, 1941)
 Pterostichus svanicus (Lutshnik, 1922)
 Pterostichus swaneticus (Reitter, 1883)
 Pterostichus variabilis (Ménétriés, 1832)
 Pterostichus zamotajlovi Belousov, 1991
Subgenus Neohaptoderus Tschitscherine, 1898
 Pterostichus berezowskii (Tschitscherine, 1898)
 Pterostichus catei Sciaky & Wrase, 1997
 Pterostichus comorus Jedlicka, 1932
 Pterostichus gravis Jedlicka, 1939
 Pterostichus haesitatus Fairmaire, 1889
 Pterostichus ignavus (Tschitscherine, 1897)
 Pterostichus jureceki (Jedlicka, 1936)
 Pterostichus kleinfeldianus Sciaky & Wrase, 1997
 Pterostichus komalus (Jedlicka, 1936)
 Pterostichus maderi Jedlicka, 1938
 Pterostichus molopsoides Jedlicka, 1934
 Pterostichus montigena (Tschitscherine, 1898)
 Pterostichus mundus Jedlicka, 1938
 Pterostichus oreophilus (Tschitscherine, 1898)
 Pterostichus orestes (Jedlicka, 1936)
 Pterostichus sinicus (Tschitscherine, 1897)
 Pterostichus szetschuanensis Tschitscherine, 1889
 Pterostichus yunnanensis Jedlicka, 1934
Subgenus Nialoe Tanaka, 1958
 Pterostichus asymmetricus Bates, 1883
 Pterostichus basilobatus Sasakawa, 2005
 Pterostichus biexcisus Straneo, 1955
 Pterostichus bisetosus (Straneo, 1938)
 Pterostichus brunneipennis Straneo, 1955
 Pterostichus carsticus Kasahara & Y.Ito, 1989
 Pterostichus chujoi Habu, 1959
 Pterostichus cristatoides Straneo, 1955
 Pterostichus daihizanus Ishida, 1968
 Pterostichus daisenicus Ishida, 1958
 Pterostichus dandonis Kasahara, 1989
 Pterostichus enasanus Morita, 2007
 Pterostichus fujimurai Habu, 1958
 Pterostichus fujisanus Tanaka & Suga, 1972
 Pterostichus fumikoae Kurosa, 2019
 Pterostichus hakusanus Kasahara, 1989
 Pterostichus hekosanensis Sasakawa, 2020
 Pterostichus himifuriho Morita, 2007
 Pterostichus hiraii Morita, 2015
 Pterostichus hirobane Habu & Baba, 1958
 Pterostichus hozumii Ishida, 1961
 Pterostichus ikukoae Morita, 2007
 Pterostichus ishizukai Kasahara, 1995
 Pterostichus isumiensis Kasahara & Saito, 1997
 Pterostichus janoi Jedlicka, 1952
 Pterostichus jogaesanensis Lafer; Paik & Park, 1996
 Pterostichus katashinensis Habu, 1958
 Pterostichus kaya Morita, 2019
 Pterostichus kongosanus Nakane, 1963
 Pterostichus latistylis Tanaka, 1958
 Pterostichus masahiroi Kasahara, 1988
 Pterostichus masatakai Morita, 2007
 Pterostichus mirificus Bates, 1883
 Pterostichus mitoyamanus Tanaka, 1971
 Pterostichus musashiensis Kasahara, 1993
 Pterostichus nakanei Straneo, 1955
 Pterostichus naokii Morita, 2003
 Pterostichus napaea Kasahara, 1988
 Pterostichus nishiyamai Kasahara, 1986
 Pterostichus ogaensis Morita, 1995
 Pterostichus ohbayashii Ishida, 1968
 Pterostichus ohdaisanus Nakane, 1963
 Pterostichus ohkurai Morita, 1996
 Pterostichus okutamae Tanaka, 1963
 Pterostichus omogoensis Nakane, 1972
 Pterostichus ompoensis Jedlicka, 1932
 Pterostichus opaculus N.Ito, 2010
 Pterostichus ovaliphallus Sasakawa, 2005
 Pterostichus parkwon Davies, 2004
 Pterostichus praedo (Tschitscherine, 1901)
 Pterostichus rhanis (Tschitscherine, 1902)
 Pterostichus ryoheii Morita, 2012
 Pterostichus ryomoensis Morita & Suda, 2007
 Pterostichus satoi Ishida, 1961
 Pterostichus shibatai Ishida, 1961
 Pterostichus shotaroi Morita, 1987
 Pterostichus sincerus Park & Kwon, 1996
 Pterostichus spiculifer Bates, 1883
 Pterostichus sugimurai Morita, 2007
 Pterostichus tahirai Kasahara, 1992
 Pterostichus takahashii Ishida, 1958
 Pterostichus tanakaorum Morita & Ohkura, 1988
 Pterostichus taoi Kasahara, 1993
 Pterostichus tokejii Yoshida & Tanaka, 1960
 Pterostichus tottoriensis Morita, 2003
 Pterostichus tsurugiyamanus Habu, 1959
 Pterostichus uchiyamai Morita, 1987
 Pterostichus uenoi Straneo, 1955
 Pterostichus watanabei Nakane, 1960
 Pterostichus yamashitai Morita, 2019
 Pterostichus yanoi Jedlicka, 1953
 Pterostichus yatsuensis Straneo, 1955
 Pterostichus yokohamae Straneo in Nakane, 1979
Subgenus Oreolyperus Tschitscherine, 1901
 Pterostichus heptapotamicus (Lutshnik, 1927)
 Pterostichus korolkowi (Tschitscherine, 1901)
 Pterostichus necessarius (Tschitscherine, 1894)
 Pterostichus regeli (Tschitscherine, 1894)
Subgenus Oreophilus Chaudoir, 1838
 Pterostichus alberti (Jeannel, 1942)
 Pterostichus cribratus (Dejean, 1828)
 Pterostichus dubius Heer, 1838
 Pterostichus duratii A. & G.B.Villa, 1835
 Pterostichus externepunctatus (Dejean, 1828)
 Pterostichus flavofemoratus (Dejean, 1828)
 Pterostichus franzi Nègre, 1955
 Pterostichus ienishteai Nitzu, 1988
 Pterostichus impressus (Fairmaire & Laboulbène, 1854)
 Pterostichus jurinei (Panzer, 1802)
 Pterostichus morio (Duftschmid, 1812)
 Pterostichus multipunctatus (Dejean, 1828)
 Pterostichus parnassius Schaum, 1859
 Pterostichus paulini (Vuillefroy, 1868)
 Pterostichus planiusculus (Chaudoir, 1859)
 Pterostichus rufipennis Baudi di Selve, 1889
 Pterostichus spinolae (Dejean, 1828)
 Pterostichus variolatus (Dejean, 1828)
 Pterostichus xatartii (Dejean, 1828)
 Pterostichus yvanii (Dejean, 1828)
Subgenus Oreoplatysma Jakobson, 1907
 Pterostichus abishirensis Belousov, 1991
 Pterostichus araraticus Kirschenhofer, 1987
 Pterostichus asinubas Davies, 2004
 Pterostichus belizini (Lutshnik, 1933)
 Pterostichus belousovi Kryzhanovskij, 1989
 Pterostichus borcka Jedlicka, 1963
 Pterostichus capitolinus Kurnakov, 1962
 Pterostichus casaleianus Kirschenhofer, 1991
 Pterostichus cecchiniae (Jakobson, 1907)
 Pterostichus chefsuricus Reitter, 1896
 Pterostichus colchicus (Chaudoir, 1850)
 Pterostichus cordifer Reitter, 1896
 Pterostichus cunibakus Davies, 2004
 Pterostichus daghestanus Reitter, 1896
 Pterostichus depressidorsis Reitter, 1896
 Pterostichus faunus Kurnakov, 1962
 Pterostichus fencli Dvorak, 1995
 Pterostichus ghilarovi Kryzhanovskij, 1988
 Pterostichus jakobsonianus (Lutshnik, 1928)
 Pterostichus kadleci Dvorak, 1995
 Pterostichus kirschenblatti Kryzhanovskij, 1988
 Pterostichus koenigi (Reitter, 1887)
 Pterostichus krasnopolensis Kirschenhofer, 1987
 Pterostichus kvirensis Belousov, 1991
 Pterostichus lodosi Heinz, 1977
 Pterostichus mediocris Dvorak, 1995
 Pterostichus nikodymi Dvorak, 1995
 Pterostichus odvarkai Dvorak, 1995
 Pterostichus orman Jedlicka, 1963
 Pterostichus pasanauricus Kirschenhofer, 1987
 Pterostichus percontator Reitter, 1887
 Pterostichus planaticollis Kirschenhofer, 1987
 Pterostichus platyderus (Chaudoir, 1850)
 Pterostichus pulchellus (Faldermann, 1836)
 Pterostichus rousianus Kirschenhofer, 1987
 Pterostichus rubripalpis Csiki, 1930
 Pterostichus satunini (Tschitscherine, 1903)
 Pterostichus satyrus Kurnakov, 1962
 Pterostichus schodaicus Kirschenhofer, 1987
 Pterostichus setosicus Davies, 2004
 Pterostichus sojaki Kirschenhofer, 1987
 Pterostichus stomoides (Chaudoir, 1868)
 Pterostichus strasseri Reitter, 1898
 Pterostichus tamarae Wrase & Kirschenhofer, 1991
 Pterostichus validiceps Reitter, 1887
 Pterostichus zolotarewi Reitter, 1911
Subgenus Orientostichus Sciaky & Allegro, 2013
 Pterostichus chinensis (Jedlicka, 1962)
 Pterostichus curtatus Fairmaire, 1886
 Pterostichus davidi (Tschitscherine, 1897)
 Pterostichus deceptrix (Tschitscherine, 1898)
 Pterostichus distinctissimus Jedlicka, 1940
 Pterostichus ferreroi Straneo, 1989
 Pterostichus gallopavo Sciaky & Wrase, 1997
 Pterostichus lesticoides (Straneo, 1939)
 Pterostichus machulkai Jedlicka, 1931
 Pterostichus perlutus Jedlicka, 1938
 Pterostichus prattii Bates, 1890
 Pterostichus pulcher Sciaky & Allegro, 2013
 Pterostichus semirugosus (Andrewes, 1947)
 Pterostichus simillimus Fairmaire, 1886
 Pterostichus tachongi Jedlicka, 1936
Subgenus Orsonjohnsonus Hatch, 1933
 Pterostichus johnsoni Ulke, 1889
Subgenus Paraferonia Casey, 1918
 Pterostichus lubricus LeConte, 1853
Subgenus Parahaptoderus Jeanne, 1969
 Pterostichus bielzii (Fuss, 1858)
 Pterostichus brevis (Duftschmid, 1812)
 Pterostichus vecors (Tschitscherine, 1897)
Subgenus Paralianoe Ishida, 1958
 Pterostichus kiiensis Morita & Ohkura, 1988
Subgenus Parapterostichus Desbrochers des Loges, 1906
 Pterostichus grajus (Dejean, 1828)
 Pterostichus justusii W.Redtenbacher, 1842
 Pterostichus nodicornis (Fairmaire & Laboulbène, 1854)
 Pterostichus schaschli (Marseul, 1880)
Subgenus Petrophilus Chaudoir, 1838
 Pterostichus abnormis (J.Sahlberg, 1880)
 Pterostichus acutidens (Fairmaire, 1888)
 Pterostichus alexandrovi Lafer, 1979
 Pterostichus alexeji Zamotajlov & Kryzhanovskij, 1992
 Pterostichus altaianus Jedlicka, 1958
 Pterostichus altaicus (Germar, 1823)
 Pterostichus arsenjevi Lafer, 1979
 Pterostichus bungei (Tschitscherine, 1894)
 Pterostichus calvitarsis Breit, 1912
 Pterostichus chechcirensis Lafer, 1979
 Pterostichus chinkiangensis Kirschenhofer, 1991
 Pterostichus coracinus (Newman, 1838)
 Pterostichus dauricus (Gebler, 1832)
 Pterostichus dilutipes (Motschulsky, 1844)
 Pterostichus elmbergi Poppius, 1908
 Pterostichus eximius A.Morawitz, 1862
 Pterostichus fallettii Sciaky, 1996
 Pterostichus findelii (Dejean, 1828)
 Pterostichus foveolatus (Duftschmid, 1812)
 Pterostichus glaferi O. & E.Berlov, 1996
 Pterostichus iberlovi O.Berlov, 1996
 Pterostichus jungens (Tschitscherine, 1893)
 Pterostichus jurecekianus Maran, 1940
 Pterostichus kokeilii L.Miller, 1850
 Pterostichus kurentzovi Lafer, 1979
 Pterostichus kvanmobongus Lafer, 2011
 Pterostichus lachrymosus (Newman, 1838)
 Pterostichus levadensis Lafer, 1979
 Pterostichus magoides (Straneo, 1937)
 Pterostichus magus (Mannerheim, 1825)
 Pterostichus maryseae Sun & Shi, 2018
 Pterostichus melanarius (Illiger, 1798)
 Pterostichus melanodes (Chaudoir, 1878)
 Pterostichus mellyi (Gebler, 1843)
 Pterostichus montanus (Motschulsky, 1844)
 Pterostichus monticoloides Shilenkov in Kryzhanovskij et al., 1995
 Pterostichus mroczkowskii Lafer, 2011
 Pterostichus nigellus A.Morawitz, 1862
 Pterostichus novus Straneo, 1944
 Pterostichus odaesanensis Lafer, 2011
 Pterostichus pawlowskii Lafer, 2011
 Pterostichus pertinax (Tschitscherine, 1895)
 Pterostichus petulans Jedlicka, 1938
 Pterostichus poppiusi (Semenov, 1906)
 Pterostichus probus Park & Kwon, 1996
 Pterostichus procax A.Morawitz, 1862
 Pterostichus rasilis Park & Kwon, 1996
 Pterostichus relictus (Newman, 1838)
 Pterostichus robustistylis Sasakawa, 2005
 Pterostichus schoenmanni Kirschenhofer, 1991
 Pterostichus sejunctus Bates, 1883
 Pterostichus septentrionis (Chaudoir, 1868)
 Pterostichus seriatus (Chaudoir, 1850)
 Pterostichus seungmoi Park & Kwon, 1996
 Pterostichus shingarevi Lafer, 1979
 Pterostichus silvestris Sun & Shi, 2018
 Pterostichus songoricus (Motschulsky, 1845)
 Pterostichus stygicus (Say, 1823)
 Pterostichus subaeneus (Chaudoir, 1850)
 Pterostichus sungariensis Lafer, 1979
 Pterostichus sutschanensis Jedlicka, 1962
 Pterostichus tatianae E.Berlov, 1996
 Pterostichus thunbergi A.Morawitz, 1862
 Pterostichus tomensis (Gebler, 1847)
 Pterostichus triseriatus (Gebler, 1847)
 Pterostichus tschitscherinianus (Jakobson, 1907)
 Pterostichus tuberifer Sasakawa, 2006
 Pterostichus tundrae (Tschitscherine, 1894)
 Pterostichus turanensis Jedlicka, 1959
 Pterostichus uralensis (Motschulsky, 1850)
 Pterostichus urengaicus Jurecek, 1924
 Pterostichus vladivostokensis Lafer, 1979
Subgenus Phaenoraphis Tschitscherine, 1901
 Pterostichus acuspina (Tschitscherine, 1901)
 Pterostichus peninsularis Park & Kwon, 1996
 Pterostichus sagittus Park, 2013
Subgenus Phonias Gozis, 1886
 Pterostichus apfelbecki Csiki, 1908
 Pterostichus burkhan Berlov & Anichtchenko, 2005
 Pterostichus corrusculus LeConte, 1873
 Pterostichus datshenkoae Sundukov, 2013
 Pterostichus defossus Bates, 1883
 Pterostichus diligens (Sturm, 1824)
 Pterostichus dostali Kirschenhofer, 1981
 Pterostichus eobius (Tschitscherine, 1899)
 Pterostichus femoralis (Kirby, 1837)
 Pterostichus gyrosus (Motschulsky, 1866)
 Pterostichus innshanensis Jedlicka, 1960
 Pterostichus jankowskyi (Tschitscherine, 1897)
 Pterostichus kutensis Poppius, 1905
 Pterostichus liodactylus (Tschitscherine, 1898)
 Pterostichus longinquus Bates, 1873
 Pterostichus longipennis Straneo, 1942
 Pterostichus monostigma (Tschitscherine, 1898)
 Pterostichus morawitzianus (Lutshnik, 1922)
 Pterostichus neglectus A.Morawitz, 1862
 Pterostichus ovoideus (Sturm, 1824)
 Pterostichus patruelis (Dejean, 1831)
 Pterostichus perisi Novoa, 1979
 Pterostichus ripensis (Motschulsky, 1866)
 Pterostichus sasajii Morita, 2007
 Pterostichus setipes (Tschitscherine, 1898)
 Pterostichus sotkaensis Jedlicka, 1958
 Pterostichus strenuus (Panzer, 1796)
 Pterostichus stricticollis (Solsky, 1874)
 Pterostichus subitus Csiki, 1930
 Pterostichus taksonyis Csiki, 1930
 Pterostichus ussuriensis (Tschitscherine, 1897)
Subgenus Platypterus Chaudoir, 1838
 Pterostichus dilatatus A. & G.B.Villa, 1835
 Pterostichus lineatopunctatus L.Miller, 1850
 Pterostichus lombardus K.Daniel, 1900
 Pterostichus ottomanus Apfelbeck, 1908
 Pterostichus panzeri (Panzer, 1802)
 Pterostichus truncatus (Dejean, 1828)
 Pterostichus ziegleri (Duftschmid, 1812)
Subgenus Platysma Bonelli, 1810
 Pterostichus chotanensis (Tschitscherine, 1893)
 Pterostichus cordaticollis Heyden, 1884
 Pterostichus crenulatopunctatus (R.F.Sahlberg, 1844)
 Pterostichus eschscholtzii (Germar, 1823)
 Pterostichus galinae Kabak, 1992
 Pterostichus insignicollis (Tschitscherine, 1893)
 Pterostichus leptis Bates, 1883
 Pterostichus niger (Schaller, 1783)
 Pterostichus planicola (Tschitscherine, 1899)
 Pterostichus sachtlebeni Jedlicka, 1962
 Pterostichus turcomannicus Motschulsky, 1850
Subgenus Plectes Fischer von Waldheim, 1822
 Pterostichus consors (Tschitscherine, 1893)
 Pterostichus drescheri (Fischer von Waldheim, 1817)
Subgenus Pledarus Motschulsky, 1866
 Pterostichus gibbicollis (Motschulsky, 1844)
 Pterostichus larisae Sundukov, 2013
 Pterostichus lutschniki Jedlicka, 1962
 Pterostichus nigellatus Kirschenhofer, 1991
Subgenus Pseudethira Sciaky, 1996
 Pterostichus angoarnigi Morvan, 1994
 Pterostichus atrox (Andrewes, 1937)
 Pterostichus balachowskyi Morvan, 1972
 Pterostichus balu J.Schmidt, 2009
 Pterostichus bhutanensis Morvan, 1978
 Pterostichus brancuccii Straneo, 1982
 Pterostichus brevilama Straneo, 1989
 Pterostichus bureli Morvan, 1994
 Pterostichus chainapaani J.Schmidt, 2006
 Pterostichus championi Andrewes, 1926
 Pterostichus conaensis J.Schmidt & Tian, 2011
 Pterostichus deuvei Lassalle, 1985
 Pterostichus dhorpatanicus Straneo, 1977
 Pterostichus dolens (Tschitscherine, 1900)
 Pterostichus dorjulensis Morvan, 1978
 Pterostichus exochus Andrewes, 1930
 Pterostichus fritzhiekei J.Schmidt, 1994
 Pterostichus gagates (Hope, 1831)
 Pterostichus ganesh J.Schmidt, 2006
 Pterostichus ganja J.Schmidt, 1995
 Pterostichus gerdi J.Schmidt, 2009
 Pterostichus gobettii Straneo, 1983
 Pterostichus gompanus Straneo, 1983
 Pterostichus harmandi (Tschitscherine, 1900)
 Pterostichus hartmanni J.Schmidt, 1995
 Pterostichus hedkeinekus Morvan, 1995
 Pterostichus hoelli J.Schmidt, 2009
 Pterostichus immarginatus Straneo, 1977
 Pterostichus jaljaleensis J.Schmidt, 2009
 Pterostichus janbritoi Morvan, 1994
 Pterostichus juga J.Schmidt, 2006
 Pterostichus kadoudali Morvan, 1982
 Pterostichus kalo J.Schmidt, 2012
 Pterostichus kangchenjunga J.Schmidt, 2012
 Pterostichus keltiekus Morvan, 1981
 Pterostichus kleinfeldi Straneo, 1982
 Pterostichus kopetzi J.Schmidt, 2006
 Pterostichus leica J.Schmidt, 2012
 Pterostichus letensis Habu, 1973
 Pterostichus lugi Morvan, 1982
 Pterostichus makalu J.Schmidt, 2012
 Pterostichus matsumurai Habu, 1973
 Pterostichus mewakholensis J.Schmidt, 2012
 Pterostichus miehei J.Schmidt, 2006
 Pterostichus nepalensis Straneo, 1977
 Pterostichus nowitzkii (Tschitscherine, 1899)
 Pterostichus olafi J.Schmidt, 2006
 Pterostichus perlamatus Straneo, 1989
 Pterostichus pseudoharmandi Morvan, 1981
 Pterostichus pseudoplatysma Straneo, 1982
 Pterostichus raraensis Morvan, 1980
 Pterostichus rugosiceps J.Schmidt, 2012
 Pterostichus sagarmatha J.Schmidt, 2012
 Pterostichus santostamangi J.Schmidt, 2006
 Pterostichus schrettenbrunneri J.Schmidt, 2012
 Pterostichus thanglaensis J.Schmidt, 2012
 Pterostichus tulobalu J.Schmidt, 2009
 Pterostichus weigeli J.Schmidt, 2006
 Pterostichus weiperti J.Schmidt, 2006
 Pterostichus wittmeri Morvan, 1978
Subgenus Pseudoferonina Ball, 1965
 Pterostichus amadeus Bousquet, 2012
 Pterostichus bousqueti Bergdahl in Bergdahl & Kavanaugh, 2011
 Pterostichus campbelli Bousquet, 1985
 Pterostichus humidulus (Van Dyke, 1943)
 Pterostichus lanei Van Dyke, 1926
 Pterostichus lolo Bergdahl in Bergdahl & Kavanaugh, 2011
 Pterostichus shulli (Hatch, 1949)
 Pterostichus smetanai Bousquet, 1985
 Pterostichus spathifer Bousquet, 1992
Subgenus Pseudohaptoderus Tschitscherine, 1888
 Pterostichus aemiliae Facchini & Sciaky, 2000
 Pterostichus jugivagus (Tschitscherine, 1898)
 Pterostichus ssemenovi Tschitscherine, 1888
Subgenus Pseudomaseus Chaudoir, 1838
 Pterostichus aimaki Jedlicka, 1968
 Pterostichus ambigenus Bates, 1883
 Pterostichus anthracinus (Illiger, 1798)
 Pterostichus basipunctatus Straneo, 1955
 Pterostichus carri Angus; Galian; Wrase & Chaladze, 2009
 Pterostichus chujoiellus Jedlicka, 1962
 Pterostichus fuscicornis (Reiche & Saulcy, 1855)
 Pterostichus gracilis (Dejean, 1828)
 Pterostichus hejkali B.Gueorguiev & Skoupy, 2011
 Pterostichus koslovi Solodovnikov, 2001
 Pterostichus luctuosus (Dejean, 1828)
 Pterostichus michailovi Wrase, 1992
 Pterostichus minor (Gyllenhal, 1827)
 Pterostichus mukdenensis Breit, 1933
 Pterostichus nigrita (Paykull, 1790)
 Pterostichus oenotrius Ravizza, 1975
 Pterostichus piceolus (Chaudoir, 1850)
 Pterostichus rhaeticus Heer, 1837
 Pterostichus rotundangulus A.Morawitz, 1862
 Pterostichus tenuis (Casey, 1924)
 Pterostichus tsukubasanus Kasahara, 1988
Subgenus Pseudorambousekiella Schweiger, 1967
 Pterostichus montisdeorum Schweiger, 1967
Subgenus Pseudorites Ganglbauer, 1891
 Pterostichus nicaeensis (A. & G.B.Villa, 1835)
Subgenus Pseudosteropus Chaudoir, 1838
 Pterostichus illigeri (Panzer, 1802)
 Pterostichus schmidtii (Chaudoir, 1838)
Subgenus Pterostichus Bonelli, 1810
 Pterostichus andreinii Dodero, 1922
 Pterostichus auratus Heer, 1837
 Pterostichus bischoffianus Jedlicka, 1936
 Pterostichus bruckii Schaum, 1859
 Pterostichus cantalicus (Chaudoir, 1868)
 Pterostichus cristatus (L.Dufour, 1820)
 Pterostichus devillei Puel, 1924
 Pterostichus dux L.Schaufuss, 1862
 Pterostichus epiroticus Csiki, 1930
 Pterostichus fasciatopunctatus (Creutzer, 1799)
 Pterostichus focarilei Casale & Giachino, 1985
 Pterostichus funestes Csiki, 1930
 Pterostichus hagenbachii Sturm, 1824
 Pterostichus honnoratii (Dejean, 1828)
 Pterostichus impressicollis (Fairmaire & Laboulbène, 1854)
 Pterostichus lanista (Tschitscherine, 1898)
 Pterostichus lasserrei (Dejean, 1828)
 Pterostichus latifianus Apfelbeck, 1906
 Pterostichus lumensis Apfelbeck, 1905
 Pterostichus malissorum Apfelbeck, 1905
 Pterostichus meisteri Reitter, 1885
 Pterostichus merklii (J.Frivaldszky, 1879)
 Pterostichus micans Heer, 1838
 Pterostichus pedemontanus Ganglbauer, 1891
 Pterostichus pentheri Apfelbeck, 1918
 Pterostichus phaeopus (Sainte-Claire Deville, 1903)
 Pterostichus reiseri Ganglbauer, 1889
 Pterostichus rhilensis Rottenberg, 1874
 Pterostichus ruffoi Sciaky, 1984
 Pterostichus rufipes (Dejean, 1828)
 Pterostichus rutilans (Dejean, 1828)
 Pterostichus sacheri I.Frivaldszky von Frivald, 1865
 Pterostichus vagepunctatus Heer, 1837
 Pterostichus walteri Reitter, 1883
Subgenus Rambousekiella Knirsch, 1925
 Pterostichus ledenikensis (Knirsch, 1925)
Subgenus Rhagadus Motschulsky, 1866
 Pterostichus brittoni Habu, 1958
 Pterostichus glabripennis Jedlicka, 1962
 Pterostichus harponifer Tanaka, 1987
 Pterostichus ishiii Morita; Kurosa & Mori, 2009
 Pterostichus kalhys (Motschulsky, 1866)
 Pterostichus kimurai Morita, 1994
 Pterostichus komiyai Morita, 2007
 Pterostichus laevipunctatus Tschitscherine, 1889
 Pterostichus latemarginatus (Straneo, 1936)
 Pterostichus microcephalus (Motschulsky, 1861)
 Pterostichus modicellus (Tschitscherine, 1897)
 Pterostichus mundatus Jedlicka, 1940
 Pterostichus nimbatidius (Chaudoir, 1878)
 Pterostichus polygenus Bates, 1883
 Pterostichus satsumanus Habu, 1958
 Pterostichus solskyi (Chaudoir, 1878)
 Pterostichus takaosanus Habu, 1958
 Pterostichus thorectes Bates, 1873
 Pterostichus thorectoides Jedlicka, 1958
Subgenus Sinoreophilus Sciaky, 1996
 Pterostichus potanini Tschitscherine, 1889
 Pterostichus scalptus Sciaky & Wrase, 1997
 Pterostichus strigosus Sciaky & Wrase, 1997
 Pterostichus validior Tschitscherine, 1889
Subgenus Sinosteropus Sciaky, 1994
 Pterostichus barbarae Sciaky & Facchini, 2003
 Pterostichus carinatus Sciaky & Facchini, 2003
 Pterostichus cathaicus Sciaky, 1994
 Pterostichus curvatus Sciaky & Facchini, 2003
 Pterostichus horstweiperti J.Schmidt & Guorguiev, 2013
 Pterostichus jaechianus Sciaky & Facchini, 2003
 Pterostichus jani Sciaky & Facchini, 2003
 Pterostichus latitemporis Sciaky & Wrase, 1997
 Pterostichus microbus Sciaky & Facchini, 2003
 Pterostichus perhoplites J.Schmidt & Tian, 2011
 Pterostichus pseudobarbarae Sciaky & Facchini, 2003
 Pterostichus pseudojugivagus J.Schmidt & Tian, 2011
 Pterostichus pseudorotundus Sciaky & Facchini, 2003
 Pterostichus pseudosinensis Sciaky & Facchini, 2003
 Pterostichus rotundus Sciaky, 1994
 Pterostichus schneideri Sciaky & Facchini, 2003
 Pterostichus scuticollis (Fairmaire, 1889)
 Pterostichus septemtrionalis Sciaky & Facchini, 2003
 Pterostichus sinensis Jedlicka, 1962
 Pterostichus triangularis Sciaky & Facchini, 2003
 Pterostichus wrasei Sciaky & Facchini, 2003
Subgenus Sphodroferonia Kasahara & Y.Ito, 1987
 Pterostichus abaciformis Straneo, 1955
 Pterostichus arcuaticarinatus Kasahara, 1986
 Pterostichus audax (Tschitscherine, 1895)
 Pterostichus bilobatus N.Ito, 2010
 Pterostichus bisulcitarsis N.Ito, 2012
 Pterostichus confusianus N.Ito, 2010
 Pterostichus constricticollis N.Ito, 2010
 Pterostichus esakii Ishida, 1959
 Pterostichus fenestratus Kasahara & Ohtani, 1989
 Pterostichus geojensis Sasakawa; Kim & Kubota, 2006
 Pterostichus gotoensis Kasahara & Matsumoto, 1990
 Pterostichus gracilitarsis N.Ito, 2010
 Pterostichus hikosanus Kasahara, 1994
 Pterostichus hisamatsui Ishida & Shibata, 1961
 Pterostichus imasakai Kasahara & Ohtani, 1988
 Pterostichus imitatorius N.Ito, 2010
 Pterostichus ishizuchiensis Kasahara, 1985
 Pterostichus itoi Kasahara, 1986
 Pterostichus kosakai Morita, 1998
 Pterostichus koujitanakai N.Ito, 2010
 Pterostichus kyushuensis Habu, 1955
 Pterostichus laeviceps N.Ito, 2010
 Pterostichus macrocephalus Habu, 1955
 Pterostichus marginellus Sasakawa; Kim & Kim, 2006
 Pterostichus masatakayoshidai N.Ito, 2010
 Pterostichus masidai Ishida, 1959
 Pterostichus masumotoi Tanaka; Morita & Suga, 1987
 Pterostichus miyamai Kasahara & Y.Ito, 1987
 Pterostichus mosaicus Sasakawa, 2005
 Pterostichus mucronatus Straneo, 1955
 Pterostichus multinodosus Sasakawa; Kim & Kim, 2006
 Pterostichus namedai Morita, 2019
 Pterostichus nasui Kasahara, 1993
 Pterostichus nishidai Nakane, 1989
 Pterostichus obscurimpressus N.Ito, 2010
 Pterostichus okiensis Nakane, 1989
 Pterostichus orionis Jedlicka, 1962
 Pterostichus pachinus Bates, 1883
 Pterostichus platyocularis N.Ito, 2010
 Pterostichus platypennis N.Ito, 2010
 Pterostichus plesiomorphus Nemoto, 1989
 Pterostichus prominens N.Ito, 2010
 Pterostichus pseudopachinus Nakane, 1963
 Pterostichus punctatulus N.Ito, 2010
 Pterostichus punctibasalis N.Ito, 2012
 Pterostichus raptor (Tschitscherine, 1901)
 Pterostichus sakuragii N.Ito, 2010
 Pterostichus sculpturalis N.Ito, 2012
 Pterostichus scurra (Tschitscherine, 1901)
 Pterostichus scurroides Jedlicka, 1958
 Pterostichus sediorcrus Sasakawa & Kim, 2006
 Pterostichus seunglaki Park & Kwon, 1996
 Pterostichus shiibanus Habu, 1958
 Pterostichus sphodriformis Bates, 1873
 Pterostichus strigipennis N.Ito, 2012
 Pterostichus subabacipennis N.Ito, 2012
 Pterostichus sulcatus N.Ito, 2010
 Pterostichus suruganus Straneo in Nakane, 1979
 Pterostichus symmetricus Straneo, 1955
 Pterostichus taradakensis Kasahara & Ohtani, 1988
 Pterostichus tosanus Kasahara & Y.Ito, 1997
 Pterostichus touzalinioides Sasakawa; Kim & Kim, 2007
 Pterostichus tsurugaensis Ishida, 1959
 Pterostichus variicornis Sasakawa; Kim & Kim, 2007
 Pterostichus yakushimanus Nakane & Ishida, 1961
 Pterostichus yamajii Kasahara, 1993
 Pterostichus yoshidai Kasahara, 1985
 Pterostichus yoshikawai Ishida, 1959
 Pterostichus yoshiyukiitoi N.Ito, 2010
Subgenus Steropanus Fairmaire, 1889
 Pterostichus aequus (Andrewes, 1937)
 Pterostichus alveolatus Fedorenko, 2018
 Pterostichus asulcatus Fedorenko, 2018
 Pterostichus boriskataevi Fedorenko, 2020
 Pterostichus cavifrons Fedorenko, 2018
 Pterostichus deliciatus (Andrewes, 1937)
 Pterostichus felix (Andrewes, 1937)
 Pterostichus forticornis (Fairmaire, 1889)
 Pterostichus fossifrons Fedorenko, 2020
 Pterostichus glymmiger (Andrewes, 1937)
 Pterostichus infissus (Andrewes, 1937)
 Pterostichus mengtzei Jedlicka, 1931
 Pterostichus obliteratus Fedorenko, 2018
 Pterostichus pseudoglymmiger Fedorenko, 2020
 Pterostichus pseudoviolaceus Fedorenko, 2018
 Pterostichus securipenis Fedorenko, 2020
 Pterostichus sulcatipennis Fedorenko, 2018
 Pterostichus thailandensis (Morvan, 1992)
 Pterostichus thailandicus Straneo, 1989
 Pterostichus violaceus (Straneo, 1949)
Subgenus Steropus Dejean, 1821
 Pterostichus catalonicus J.Daniel in K. & J.Daniel, 1906
 Pterostichus ebenus (Quensel, 1806)
 Pterostichus ferreri (Español & Mateu, 1942)
 Pterostichus galaecianus Lauffer, 1909
 Pterostichus gallega (Fairmaire, 1859)
 Pterostichus ghilianii (Putzeys, 1845)
 Pterostichus insidatrix (Piochard de la Brûlerie, 1872)
 Pterostichus madidus (Fabricius, 1775)
 Pterostichus rifensis Antoine, 1933
 Pterostichus validus (Dejean, 1828)
Subgenus Tausternus Fedorenko, 2020
 Pterostichus hoii Fedorenko, 2020
Subgenus Tinautius Mateu, 1997
 Pterostichus exilis (Mateu, 2001)
 Pterostichus troglophilus (Mateu, 1997)
Subgenus Tschitscherinea Berg, 1898
 Pterostichus farkaci Sciaky, 1997
 Pterostichus filum (Tschitscherine, 1897)
 Pterostichus krali Sciaky, 1997
 Pterostichus mulensis Sciaky, 1997
Subgenus Tubuliphallus Sciaky & Allegro, 2013
 Pterostichus megacephalus Sciaky & Allegro, 2013
Subgenus Unitrichus Sciaky, 1997
 Pterostichus platyops Sciaky, 1997
Subgenus Vietosteropus Fedorenko, 2017
 Pterostichus abramovi Fedorenko, 2017
 Pterostichus anichkini Fedorenko, 2017
 Pterostichus annamita (Straneo, 1939)
 Pterostichus bidoupensis Fedorenko, 2017
 Pterostichus cavicollis Straneo, 1984
 Pterostichus chupanphan Fedorenko, 2017
 Pterostichus dalatensis Fedorenko, 2017
 Pterostichus gialaiensis Fedorenko, 2017
 Pterostichus honbaensis Fedorenko, 2017
 Pterostichus konchurang Fedorenko, 2017
 Pterostichus konplongensis Fedorenko, 2017
 Pterostichus kontumensis Fedorenko, 2017
 Pterostichus kuznetsovi Fedorenko, 2020
 Pterostichus ngoclinhensis Fedorenko, 2017
 Pterostichus ngokboci Fedorenko, 2017
 Pterostichus semiopacus Fedorenko, 2017
 Pterostichus sulcicollis Fedorenko, 2017
Subgenus Wraseiellus Shi & Sciaky, 2013
 Pterostichus andrewesi Jedlicka, 1931
 Pterostichus comatus Shi & Sciaky, 2013
 Pterostichus crassiapex Shi & Sciaky, 2013
 Pterostichus diversus (Fairmaire, 1886)
 Pterostichus kambaiti (Andrewes, 1947)
 Pterostichus meyeri Jedlicka, 1934
 Pterostichus pseudodiversus Shi & Sciaky, 2013
 Pterostichus stictopleurus (Fairmaire, 1889)
Unassigned Subgenus
 Pterostichus analis Jedlicka, 1963
 Pterostichus antepunctatus Straneo, 1949
 Pterostichus aristochroides Deuve, 2006
 Pterostichus chenpengi Li, 1992
 Pterostichus clepsydra Sciaky & Wrase, 1997
 Pterostichus deuvesianus Morvan, 1995
 Pterostichus georgi Straneo, 1963
 Pterostichus glabricollis Jedlicka, 1962
 Pterostichus gwervaenus Morvan, 1995
 Pterostichus heilongjiangensis Li, 1992
 Pterostichus imitatus Morvan, 1978
 Pterostichus jelepus Andrewes, 1932
 Pterostichus kiangsu Jedlicka, 1965
 Pterostichus kolosovi (Lutshnik, 1928)
 Pterostichus leviculus Andrewes, 1933
 Pterostichus lidarus (Andrewes, 1937)
 Pterostichus lukjanovitshi (Lutshnik, 1927)
 Pterostichus malaisei Jedlicka, 1965
 Pterostichus migliaccioi Straneo, 1982
 Pterostichus orobius Fairmaire, 1861
 Pterostichus peilingi Jedlicka, 1937
 Pterostichus punctisternus Straneo, 1989
 Pterostichus quadriimpressus Straneo, 1983
 Pterostichus reuteri Wrase & J.Schmidt, 2006
 Pterostichus rolex Morvan, 1995
 Pterostichus sintanus Andrewes, 1927
 Pterostichus styx (Andrewes, 1937)
 Pterostichus szekessyianus Sciaky, 1996
 Pterostichus tantillus (Fairmaire, 1889)
 Pterostichus tonkinensis Straneo, 1980
 Pterostichus zhejiangensis Kirschenhofer, 1997
 †Pterostichus abrogatus Scudder, 1890
 †Pterostichus depletus Scudder, 1900
 †Pterostichus destitutus Scudder, 1890
 †Pterostichus destructus Scudder, 1890
 †Pterostichus dormitans Scudder, 1890
 †Pterostichus fernquisti Wickham, 1931
 †Pterostichus fractus Scudder, 1890
 †Pterostichus laevigatus Scudder, 1890
 †Pterostichus minax (Oustalet, 1874)
 †Pterostichus minutulus Heer, 1862
 †Pterostichus provincialis (Oustalet, 1874)
 †Pterostichus pumpellyi Scudder, 1900
 †Pterostichus walcotti Scudder, 1900

References

 
Pterostichinae
Taxa named by Franco Andrea Bonelli